Adorable may refer to:
 Adorable (band), a British rock band from the 1990s
 Adorable (film), a 1933 American film directed by William Dieterle
 "Adorable", a 1955 song by The Drifters

See also

 Adore (disambiguation)
 Cuteness
 Love